Eustace Llewellyn John CMG (1939 – 27 July 2017) was the Deputy Governor-General of Nevis from 1992 to 2017. He was the second person to have served as deputy Governor-General of Nevis, preceded only by Weston Parris (died 1992), who served from 1983 until 1992.

Governor-General of Saint Kitts and Nevis appoints the Deputy Governor-General of Nevis to signify assent or the withholding of assent to any bill passed by the Nevis Island Assembly on behalf of the governor-general. The Deputy Governor-General performs the functions of the office of Governor-General as they relate to the island of Nevis.

Before being appointed, John was the Commercial and Accounts Manager at ZIZ Broadcasting Corporation (ZBC) in St. Kitts from 1971 to 1972 and the General Manager from 1972 to 1981.

External links 
 Nevis Island Administration profile

References 

1939 births
2017 deaths
Companions of the Order of St Michael and St George
Saint Kitts and Nevis politicians
People from Nevis